A muffler is a device for reducing the amount of noise emitted by a machine.

Muffler may also refer to:

A type of scarf
A silencer fitted to a gun, known as a suppressor

Surname
Betty Muffler, Aboriginal Australian artist and healer

See also
 Muffle
 Sound attenuator
 Ear muff